The Netherlands participated in the Eurovision Song Contest 2015 with the song "Walk Along" written by Tobias Karlsson and Anouk Teeuwe. The song was performed by Trijntje Oosterhuis, who was internally selected by the Dutch broadcaster AVROTROS to represent the Netherlands at the 2015 contest in Vienna, Austria. Songwriter Anouk Teeuwe represented the Netherlands in the Eurovision Song Contest 2013 with the song "Birds" where she placed ninth in the grand final of the competition. Trijntje Oosterhuis' appointment as the Dutch representative was announced on 10 November 2014, while the song, "Walk Along", was presented to the public on 11 December 2014.

The Netherlands was drawn to compete in the first semi-final of the Eurovision Song Contest which took place on 19 May 2015. Performing during the show in position 4, "Walk Along" was not announced among top 10 entries of the first semi-final and therefore did not qualify to compete in the final. It was later revealed that the Netherlands placed fourteenth out of the 16 participating countries in the semi-final with 33 points.

Background 
Following the introduction of semi-finals for the 2004 contest, the Netherlands had featured in only three finals. The Dutch least successful result has been last place, which they have achieved on five occasions, most recently in the second semi-final of the 2011 contest.

The Dutch national broadcaster, AVROTROS, broadcasts the event within the Netherlands and organises the selection process for the nation's entry. The Netherlands has used various methods to select the Dutch entry in the past, such as the Nationaal Songfestival, a live televised national final to choose the performer, song or both to compete at Eurovision. However, internal selections have also been held on occasion. Since 2013, the broadcaster has internally selected the Dutch entry for the contest. In 2013, the internal selection of Anouk performing "Birds" managed to take the country to the final for the first time in eight years and placed ninth overall. In 2014, the internal selection of the Common Linnets performing "Calm After the Storm" qualified the nation to the final once again and placed second, making it the most successful Dutch result in the contest since their victory in 1975. For 2015, the broadcaster opted to continue selecting the Dutch entry through an internal selection.

Before Eurovision

Internal selection 

Following the Common Linnets' second place in 2014 with the song "Calm After the Storm", the Dutch broadcaster revealed in August 2014 that they would continue to internally select both the artist and song for the Eurovision Song Contest, while later revealing in October 2014 that an announcement would be expected in November 2014 after several artists had already been in contact with the broadcaster in regards to participating. Artists that were rumoured in Dutch media to be in talks with AVROTROS included singers Dotan and Alain Clark. 

On 1 November 2014, Dutch media reported that AVROTROS had selected singer Trijntje Oosterhuis to represent the Netherlands at the 2015 contest, possibly as part of the group Ladies of Soul which also included former Dutch Eurovision entrants Edsilia Rombley (1998 and 2007) and Glennis Grace (2005). Oosterhuis was confirmed as the Dutch entrant on 10 November 2014 during the NPO Radio 2 programme Gouden Uren, hosted by Daniël Dekker. The selection of Trijntje Oosterhuis as the Dutch representative occurred through a selection commission consisting of television host and author Cornald Maas, radio DJ Daniël Dekker and AVROTROS media-director Remco van Leen.

On 11 December 2014, Trijntje Oosterhuis' Eurovision entry, "Walk Along", was presented to the public during Gouden Uren, followed by a live performance of the song the following day during a broadcast of The Voice of Holland on RTL 4 where she also one of the coaches for the competition. The official video for the song was released on 13 March 2015. "Walk Along" was written by Tobias Karlsson and Anouk Teeuwe, the latter of whom previously represented the Netherlands at the Eurovision Song Contest 2013. Anouk revealed earlier during an interview on the Dutch talk show College Tour on 7 November 2014 that she had written Oosterhuis' Eurovision song, of which Oosterhuis described as an "incredible fresh song that people wouldn't expect from Anouk or her" during her 8 November interview on Gouden Uren.

Promotion 
In the lead up to the Eurovision Song Contest, Trijntje Oosterhuis' promotional activities occurred entirely within the Netherlands where she performed at live events, radio shows and talk shows. On 9 April, Oosterhuis performed during the Eurovision in Concert event which was held at the Melkweg venue in Amsterdam and hosted by Cornald Maas and Edsilia Rombley.

At Eurovision 

According to Eurovision rules, all nations with the exceptions of the host country and the "Big Five" (France, Germany, Italy, Spain and the United Kingdom) are required to qualify from one of two semi-finals in order to compete for the final; the top ten countries from each semi-final progress to the final. In the 2015 contest, Australia also competed directly in the final as an invited guest nation. The European Broadcasting Union (EBU) split up the competing countries into five different pots based on voting patterns from previous contests, with countries with favourable voting histories put into the same pot. On 26 January 2015, a special allocation draw was held which placed each country into one of the two semi-finals, as well as which half of the show they would perform in. The Netherlands was placed into the first semi-final, to be held on 19 May 2015, and was scheduled to perform in the first half of the show.

Once all the competing songs for the 2015 contest had been released, the running order for the semi-finals was decided by the shows' producers rather than through another draw, so that similar songs were not placed next to each other. The Netherlands was set to perform in position 4, following the entry from Belgium and before the entry from Finland.

The two semi-finals and the final were broadcast on NPO 1 and BVN as well as via radio on NPO Radio 2. All broadcasts featured commentary by Cornald Maas and Jan Smit. The Dutch spokesperson, who announced the Dutch votes during the final, was 1998 and 2007 Dutch Eurovision entrant Edsilia Rombley.

Semi-final

Trijntje Oosterhuis took part in technical rehearsals on 11 and 15 May, followed by dress rehearsals on 18 and 19 May. This included the jury show on 18 May where the professional juries of each country watched and voted on the competing entries. 

The Dutch performance featured Trijntje Oosterhuis performing together with four backing vocalists. During the first technical rehearsal, Oosterhuis wore a black dress with a revealing opened front designed by Prince Charming (Tycho Boeker), however it received considerable media coverage in the Netherlands sparking both positive and negative reactions from the Dutch press and public alike. In regards to the commentaries on her dress, the singer stated: "I've heard people are talking about it, but I find it strange and don't really understand it. I'm just not used to people talking about such things. I hope they will talk about the song again". Oosterhuis would later opt to change her outfit to a black parachute-like pantsuit. The performance was opened with a zoomed-in view of the singer's eyes covered by a veil, which she tore off at the first chorus. The stage colours transitioned between white, blue, green and red with the LED screens displaying a walking shadow figure. The four backing vocalists that joined Trijntje Oosterhuis were: Patt Riley, Michelle Oudeman, Lesley van der Aa and Jenny Lane. The staging director for the performance was Hans Pannecoucke, who also worked with the Dutch entrant in 2014 in a similar role.

At the end of the show, the Netherlands was not announced among the top 10 entries in the first semi-final and therefore failed to qualify to compete in the final. It was later revealed that the Netherlands placed fourteenth in the semi-final, receiving a total of 33 points.

Voting
Voting during the three shows consisted of 50 percent public televoting and 50 percent from a jury deliberation. The jury consisted of five music industry professionals who were citizens of the country they represent, with their names published before the contest to ensure transparency. This jury was asked to judge each contestant based on: vocal capacity; the stage performance; the song's composition and originality; and the overall impression by the act. In addition, no member of a national jury could be related in any way to any of the competing acts in such a way that they cannot vote impartially and independently. The individual rankings of each jury member were released shortly after the grand final.

Following the release of the full split voting by the EBU after the conclusion of the competition, it was revealed that the Netherlands had placed fifteenth with the public televote and fifth with the jury vote in the first semi-final. In the public vote, the Netherlands scored 23 points, while with the jury vote, the Netherlands scored 70 points.

Below is a breakdown of points awarded to the Netherlands and awarded by the Netherlands in the first semi-final and grand final of the contest, and the breakdown of the jury voting and televoting conducted during the two shows:

Points awarded to the Netherlands

Points awarded by the Netherlands

Detailed voting results
The following members comprised the Dutch jury:
  (jury chairperson)singer, musical actress
 media professional
 creative director
 radio DJ, host
 Dominique Rijpma van Hulst (Do)singer

References 

2015
Countries in the Eurovision Song Contest 2015
Eurovision